Christopher Alan Wallace (born March 22, 1982) is an American singer, songwriter, and producer. He was prominently known as the former lead vocalist and front man of the American pop rock band The White Tie Affair. Wallace has released one album, Push Rewind in 2012. In 2016, Wallace signed a songwriting contract with Pulse Music Group.

Solo career
On July 10, 2012, Wallace released his first solo single, "Remember When (Push Rewind)", a month after The White Tie Affair broke up. The song has appeared on several major pop radio stations. His music video for the single premiered on MTV Buzzworthy.
 The song is about looking back and wanting to relive your past. He said in an interview, that the underlying message of the song is positive in that "Even if things don’t work out and I can’t change them, I’m still glad it happened. And the worst case scenario is that you learn a lesson.”

On August 23, 2012, Chris tweeted that his first solo album, Push Rewind, would be available on iTunes on September 4. On September 4, 2012, his debut solo album was released via ThinkSay Records.  As of May 2020, Chris has planned to release new music every few weeks for the rest of the year.

Discography

Albums

Singles

Select songwriting/production discography

References

1982 births
Place of birth missing (living people)
Living people
21st-century American singers
21st-century American male singers
American male pop singers
American rock songwriters
American rock singers
People from Porter County, Indiana
Record producers from Indiana
American male singer-songwriters
Singer-songwriters from Indiana